The Stevens Street Historic District is a  historic district in Thomasville, Georgia.  It is located one block northwest of Thomas County Courthouse.

It was listed on the National Register of Historic Places in 2001.  It was noted to be "an intact African-American neighborhood that developed in Thomasville, Thomas County following the end of the Civil War."  It then included 341 contributing buildings and three contributing structures, as well as 83 non-contributing structures.

Especially significant buildings include the Clay Street YMCA and the Recreation Center at 404 West Calhoun Street.

References

Historic districts on the National Register of Historic Places in Georgia (U.S. state)
Greek Revival architecture in Georgia (U.S. state)
Colonial Revival architecture in Georgia (U.S. state)
Buildings and structures completed in 1850
National Register of Historic Places in Thomas County, Georgia